Coronatine (COR) is a toxin produced by the bacterium Pseudomonas syringae.  It is involved in causing  stomata to re-open after they close in response to pathogen-associated molecular patterns, as well as interfering with the responses mediated by salicylic acid after the infection has begun.  It consists of coronafacic acid (CFA), which is an analog of methyl  jasmonic acid (MeJA), and coronamic acid (CMA), joined by an amide bond between the acid group of CFA and the amino group of CMA.

References 

Carboxylic acids
Bacterial toxins
Cyclopropanes
Carboxamides
Ketones
Cyclohexenes